The Penske PC-11 was an CART open-wheel race car, designed by Penske Racing, which was constructed for competition in the 1983 IndyCar season.

References

Racing cars
American Championship racing cars